Wildboyz is an American television series. It is a spin-off and follow-up to Jackass. Wildboyz debuted in 2003 on MTV, and moved to MTV2 in its third season. The show starred Steve-O and Chris Pontius, who perform stunts and acts with animals, often putting themselves in situations for which they are not trained.

Format

Wildboyz follows the antics of Chris Pontius and Steve-O, as they travel around the globe. Over the course of 4 seasons, Pontius and Steve-O have traveled to 19 different locations. At each location, the pair would both interact with the wild as well as learn the culture of the natives. Some of their antics include dressing up and running with the animals they encounter, subjecting themselves to the defense mechanisms of the animals, and eating the food of the native cultures.

The dangerous nature of the stunts arguably outstrips that of either Jackass or another similar spin-off, Viva La Bam. In the course of the show, Steve-O has purposely subjected himself to the relatively mild sting of the emperor scorpion on more than one occasion, and Pontius has nearly been attacked by a jaguar and has been bitten by a black bear. One of their most dangerous stunts showed the boys attracting a great white shark while disguised as seals, then later jumping into the open water just 10m away, as well as placing dangling meat attached to a hammock to attract lions. In another dangerous stunt, the pair dressed up as fake zebras to try to lure lions. The supposed sport of "hyena football" also made its debut, which in its earliest form was nothing more than a game of keep-away with a pack of spotted hyenas, using smoked ham as a ball. The "sport", according to its founders, "deserves Olympic status".

Some of the scenes were intentionally mislabeled as many of the animals used were from a company called Hollywood Animals.

Despite the crude humor, the show has educational value, as it features accurate narrations of various animals and indigenous cultures. What separates Steve-O and Chris Pontius from their animal show-host colleagues is their complete fearlessness despite their lack of training.  This recklessness is also seen in their willingness to interact with the various cultures that they come in contact with. Steve-O and Chris seem open to any new experience, which has given them a chance to experience rituals and partake in events that a typical visitor or tourist may not be privy to.

Several members of the Jackass cast and crew have contributed assistance to the show. The director of Jackass, Jeff Tremaine, served as director and executive producer of Wildboyz. Cameramen Dimitry Elyashkevich and Rick Kosick also continued to work alongside Tremaine on Wildboyz. Manny Puig, a wild animal expert who appeared on Jackass several times, occasionally joins the Wildboyz on their adventures. Fellow Jackass cast members Johnny Knoxville, Wee Man and Loomis Fall also make guest appearances on the show throughout all four seasons.

End
The show ended in 2006, after four seasons. Steve-O later wrote in his memoir that "Wildboyz probably could've kept going after Season 4. It just didn't seem like there was a point. Over time it had essentially evolved back into Jackass. During our final trip to Russia there were no stunts that wouldn't have fit in just as easily on Jackass. Johnny Knoxville came along on that trip too, which contributed even more to that vibe." Though no proper series finale was created, the concept of Wildboyz was somewhat revisited during Jackass Number Two, which was filmed after Wildboyz had ended. Director Jeff Tremaine says, "We shot some of the most amazing stuff [for Wildboyz] we've ever made. And so one of the ideas with Number Two was to recreate some of the best things we ever shot for Wildboyz. Unfortunately, it didn't always work out."
"The Fish Hook" sketch in Jackass Number Two featured Wildboyz stars Pontius, Steve-O and frequent collaborator Manny Puig, fishing for sharks in the Gulf of Mexico. The sketch involved Pontius fishing with Steve-O as his bait, and in order to attach himself to Pontius' fishing line, Steve-O put a fish hook through his cheek. The sketch ended after Steve-O kicked a mako shark in the head. During the commentary for Jackass Number Two, Jackass/Wildboyz cameraman Dimitry Elyashkevich jokingly called the sketch "Wildboyz: The Movie!".
The "How to Milk a Horse" sketch was in fact filmed for Wildboyz, according to Jeff Tremaine in the director's commentary for the DVD release, but due to its explicit content (Steve-O, Pontius, and Knoxville obtained a sperm sample from a studded horse, which Pontius proceeded to drink), Tremaine said that it would never have aired on MTV.

Additional footage captured during the filming of Jackass Number Two also followed a Wildboyz-style format. These sketches can be seen in Jackass 2.5: 
A balloon is placed between Steve-O's butt and is popped by the bite of an eastern diamondback rattlesnake.
Chris Pontius is bitten on the nose by a snapping turtle in a scene identical to one filmed for Wildboyz.
Wee Man runs through the streets of India with dozens of other short men all dressed in blue with orange wigs, chasing Preston Lacy, and vice versa. 
Steve-O drinks beer off the fingernails of Shridhar Chillal, an Indian man alleged to have the longest fingernails in the world. Steve-O throws up repeatedly, upsetting the many Indian actresses on set.
One sketch was designed to display all Indian stereotypes in one scene. After much searching for a talent to perform this skit, Ehren McGhehey agrees reluctantly. He lies on a bed of nails wearing a turban with a cobra in a basket on his chest. He is surrounded by Indian snake charmers, a painted elephant, and Wildboyz stars Pontius and Steve-O.
In a sketch dubbed by director Jeff Tremaine to be "the ultimate failed bit," Jackass stars Chris Pontius, Steve-O, and Dave England visit the Aghori tribe of India. The tribe disturbs the actors and the sketch fails.
A sketch where Johnny Knoxville gets a prostate exam in Russia was originally shot for Wildboyz, but it never got shown on TV and was put in Jackass 2.5.
Sketches similar to Wildboyz in Jackass 3D include:
 Dave England and Steve-O playing tetherball with a beehive.
 Chris Pontius' chin being dressed up as a barbarian while he's "battling" scorpions.

Other sketches in Jackass 3.5 similar to Wildboyz include:
 Steve-O getting bitten on the buttocks by an alligator snapping turtle. Steve-O claimed numerous times throughout Wildboyz his dislike for alligator snapping turtles. Once the turtle bit, it refused to let go as Steve-O screamed and writhed in pain.
 During the filming of Jackass 3D, Jeff Tremaine discussed a scene he shot for Wildboyz, in which Steve-O and Chris Pontius wore a two-person llama costume, and an actual llama with an erection attempted to mate with the costume. Tremaine claimed that seeing Steve-O, the bottom half, being "raped" by the llama was "the funniest thing he had ever filmed." The Jackass crew made an unsuccessful attempt to replicate this with a donkey and a costume of one with clearly defined orifices. Steve-O and Johnny Knoxville wore the costume. Even after coating the orifices with female donkey urine, the donkey failed to become aroused. The same donkey suit makes a cameo appearance during the end credits of the 2012 Girl & Chocolate skateboard movie Pretty Sweet.
Sketches in Jackass Forever similar to Wildboyz include:
 At the end of the opening sequence of Jackass Forever, Chris Pontius gets bit on his penis by a snapping turtle. 
 Steve-O putting a queen bee around his penis. A lot of other bees then latch onto and sting his penis.
 New cast member Sean "Poopies" McInerney attempting to kiss a Texas rat snake.
 Ehren McGhehey getting his nipple bit by a tarantula.
 New cast member Rachel Wolfson getting a botox injection by a scorpion.
 A vulture eating pieces of meat off of Wee Man's body as he is tied to the ground, while Chris Pontius and Steve-O are worshiping the vulture. This skit is similar to the "sarcophilus satanicus" skit from Wildboyz.
 Chris Pontius drinking pig semen and Dave England unsuspectingly getting a lot of it poured over him.
Sketches in Jackass 4.5 similar to Wildboyz include:
 Ehren McGhehey and Wee Man standing in a see-through tub with an electric eel. Wee Man then puts a key in Ehren's ass and touches the electric eel.
 Wee Man unsuspectingly getting horse semen poured over him.
 Steve-O putting fish in his ass and having a raptor attack and eat it.
 Steve-O getting his eyebrows waxed off by tying the thread to an eagle that flies away.
 New cast member Poopies unsuspectingly getting pig semen poured over him.

Cast and crew

Starring
 Chris Pontius
 Steve-O

Recurring
 Manny Puig

Guest stars
 Johnny Knoxville
 Wee-Man
 David Hasselhoff
 Method Man
 Juvenile
 Three 6 Mafia
 Loomis Fall
 Mat Hoffman
 Tony Hawk
 Macaque
 "Black mamba"

Home media

Season releases

All 4 seasons became available for streaming on Paramount+ on June 1, 2022.

See also 
Jackass
Viva La Bam

References

External links
 
 

MTV original programming
MTV2 original programming
2000s American black comedy television series
2000s American mockumentary television series
2003 American television series debuts
2006 American television series endings
American television spin-offs
Jackass (TV series)
English-language television shows
Television series by Dickhouse Productions